Flower Hill Cemetery may refer to:

 Flower Hill Cemetery (Flower Hill, New York)
 Flower Hill Cemetery (North Bergen, New Jersey)
 Flower Hill Cemetery, Fulton, Arkansas
 Flower Hill Cemetery, Bennington, Nebraska
 Flower Hill Cemetery, Grand Cane, Louisiana
 Flower Hill Cemetery, at the Amelia Court House, Virginia